This is a partial chronological list of cases decided by the United States Supreme Court during the Hughes Court, the tenure of Chief Justice Charles Evans Hughes from February 24, 1930 through June 30, 1941.

References 

Hughes
List